Billy Joe Mantooth (July 23, 1951 – July 23, 1986) was an American football linebacker from Clendenin, West Virginia, known as "The Man-Eater" during his playing days. He started his career at Ferrum College; after being honored as an NJCAA All-American in 1970, he transferred to West Virginia University.  He also later played in the NFL.

High school

Born to Rhondle Mantooth and Adabell Bowen Mantooth, Billy Joe Mantooth played his high school football at Herbert Hoover High School. He wore number 31, and played on both offense and defense. It was his skills as a linebacker which won him selection to the West Virginia All-State Football team in 1968.

Mantooth hoped to play Division I football after graduating from high school, but the college coaches said that while he was a very promising linebacker, they advised that at less than 200 pounds, Mantooth needed to "bulk up" to compete at the major college level.

College
Mantooth started his college career playing junior college football for the Ferrum College Panthers.  After earning NJCAA All-American honors in 1970, he was heavily recruited by several different schools.

Recruited by Marshall University/1970 plane crash
Mantooth's name is well known in the story of the 1970 Marshall Thundering Herd football team.  En route back to Huntington, West Virginia from a game against East Carolina, the Marshall team's Southern Airways Flight 932 clipped some trees on approach to Tri-State Airport and the plane crashed at a nearly vertical altitude into a ravine short of the runway. All seventy-five people on board were killed. The football team was decimated: thirty-seven players and five of the eight coaches lost their lives.  The lives of two Marshall coaches were spared due to a recruiting trip trying to bring Mantooth to the Thundering Herd, as assistant coaches Red Dawson and Gail Parker were on their way to see the star linebacker known as "The Man-Eater" at Ferrum College in Ferrum, Virginia. Dawson had actually driven to the East Carolina game and, joined by Parker (who had switched places with Deke Brackett, another coach), was to drive to Ferrum from Greenville, North Carolina at the game's conclusion. However, en route to see Mantooth, Dawson and Parker heard about the crash on the radio.

West Virginia University
In 1971, Mantooth signed with West Virginia University to finish his college career at a Division I school; he had gained 40 pounds of muscle since high school. He reportedly choose WVU because he was a West Virginia native and because of the excitement around town about new head coach and offensive innovator Bobby Bowden.  Wearing number 50, Mantooth was a co-captain of the WVU football team in 1972.

1972 West Virginia vs. Penn State Game
West Virginia fans clearly remember a key play from the 1972 Penn State game involving Mantooth: Penn State's Bob Nagle fumbled before the goal line, and two West Virginia players—Mantooth and Dennis Harris—successfully pounced on the ball at the three-yard line, yet Penn State was incorrectly awarded a touchdown.

NFL career
In 1973, Mantooth joined the NFL as a linebacker for the Philadelphia Eagles when Coach Mike McCormack found Mantooth at the NFL's free agent camp in April.  Mantooth was released by the Eagles that summer before the 1973 NFL season began.  He was drafted by the WFL's Philadelphia Bell in 1974 in the 37th round as the 435th pick, but Mantooth instead remained in the NFL by joining the roster of the Houston Oilers, where he remained until 1975.

The Big Blow
In April 1981, Mantooth, who was 6'3", 230 lb. at the time, was involved in The Big Blow, an altercation where he punched former University of Kentucky football player Dan Fowler, rendering the 6'4", 240 lb. Fowler unconscious. In 1982, a Fayette Circuit Court jury awarded $20,000 ($ in  dollars when adjusted for inflation) to Fowler after he sued Mantooth over the punch, but the award was overturned by Kentucky Court of Appeals in 1983 and then reinstated by the Kentucky Supreme Court in 1984.

Death
A resident of Bridgeport, West Virginia, Mantooth was killed in a one-car crash on Interstate 79 near Sutton, West Virginia on July 23, 1986 (his 35th birthday) while employed by Metec Inc. of Lexington, Kentucky.

Family
Mantooth was survived by his widow, Pam, and daughter, Michelle, who earned her degree in psychology at her father's alma mater and earned a McNair Scholarship for her pursuit of a Ph.D.

He was also survived by his eldest daughter, Amy Coffin. Amy is a graduate of Virginia Tech and resides in Northern Virginia with her husband and three children, plus his older brother, John (nicknamed "Butch"), and three sisters, Rhonda, Tammy, and Loretta.

References

1951 births
1986 deaths
Ferrum Panthers football players
West Virginia Mountaineers football players
American football linebackers
Philadelphia Eagles players
Houston Oilers players
People from Bridgeport, West Virginia
People from Clendenin, West Virginia
Road incident deaths in West Virginia
Players of American football from West Virginia